The Courts Act 2003 (c.39) is an Act of the Parliament of the United Kingdom implementing many of the recommendations in Sir Robin Auld's (a Court of Appeal judge) Review of the Criminal Courts in England and Wales (also known as the "Auld Review").  The White Paper which preceded the Act was published by the Home Office on the 17 July 2002 and called "Justice for All".

The Act has nine parts:

 Maintenance of the court system
 Justices of the Peace
 Magistrates' courts
 Court security
 Inspectors of court administration
 Judges
 Procedure rules and practice directions
 Miscellaneous
 Final provisions (technical provisions)

The Act deals predominantly with criminal courts' administration, though certain sections deal with civil matters (notably creating a post of "Head of Civil Justice", enabling provisions for family procedure rules, and amendments to its civil procedure equivalent).

The Act also abolished magistrates' courts committees, combining the magistrates' courts' administration with the Court Service, which was then renamed Her Majesty's Courts Service. "Fines Officers" are instituted in order to strengthen the system for collecting fines after the existing system was criticised for relative ineffectiveness.  Schedule 1 of the Act provided for the establishment of courts boards.

Sections 50 to 57 of this act also provide court security officers the power of search, seizure/retention of items, restraint and removal from court when performing their duties.

The act also transfers the authority and obligation of high sheriffs, in relation to civil writs, to sheriff's officers; previously, high sheriffs had delegated these to the sheriff's officers, in any case, but the Blair Ministry preferred to make this explicit, and remove the theoretical power of the high sheriff. It also renames this more-than-1000-year-old role - the sheriff's officer - to High court enforcement officers, for reasons that have not been explained, except perhaps to give it a modern-sounding name.

References

External links
Department for Constitutional Affairs - The Courts - Courts Act 2003
The Courts Act 2003, as originally enacted, from the Office of Public Sector Information.

United Kingdom Acts of Parliament 2003
Acts of the Parliament of the United Kingdom concerning England and Wales